The Enigma of Arrival is a 2020 Chinese drama film directed by Song Wen and starring Li Xian, Xuan Gu, and Lin Xiaofan.  The film was premiere on 2018 Busan Film Festival.

Synopsis
After many years, a group of high school friends reunites. They have not seen each other since the disappearance of Dondong, a girl they all secretly fancied. The circumstances of her disappearance cause the end of their friendship. Although a long time has passed, there are still things unspoken about what exactly happened during those crucial years.

Cast
 Li Xian as Xiao Long  
 Xuan Gu as Li Dongdong 
 Lin Xiaofan as Da Si

Release

Theatrical
The Enigma of Arrival had its premiere at the Busan International Film Festival, October 2018. The film was released in China on July 31 in IMAX and 3D. It was originally scheduled to be released on Valentine's Day 2020, but delayed to amid the Coronavirus disease.

Reception

Box Office
The Enigma of Arrival grossed $3.34 million in its debut, according to Ent Group.

References

External links
 
 

Films postponed due to the COVID-19 pandemic
2018 films
2010s Mandarin-language films
Chinese drama films